Stanley Bennion (9 February 1938 – 5 August 2013) was an English professional footballer. He played in the Football League as a winger for Wrexham and Chester.

Playing career
Bennion progressed through Wrexham's youth setup and signed as a part-time professional with the club in September 1959. He went on to make more than 50 league appearances over the next four years but his opportunities became limited after the signing of Arfon Griffiths in 1962. The following season saw him agree to join Halifax Town, but the move collapsed and Stan joined Chester in time for the 1963–64 season as part of a swap deal with Bill Myerscough.

He made 20 league appearances in his first season with Chester but did not make any more the following season, although he did play in a Welsh Cup tie at Wrexham. He also scored both goals when captain of the Chester side that beat Tranmere Rovers 2–0 to win the Cheshire Bowl.

Bennion then dropped into non-league football, playing for New Brighton until 1970 and then spending four years with Rhyl. He continued to play local football in the Chester area into the 1990s. Outside football he has been employed by Cheshire County Council.

External links

Bibliography

References

1938 births
2013 deaths
Sportspeople from Chester
English footballers
Association football wingers
Wrexham A.F.C. players
Chester City F.C. players
New Brighton A.F.C. players
Rhyl F.C. players
English Football League players